The Album of the Year Tour was a concert tour by San Francisco band Faith No More, in support of their 1997 release Album of the Year. It was Faith No More's final tour before their original breakup in April 1998. Only 32 of the dates were in their native North America, due to the band's greater popularity overseas at the time.

Background
The tour covered several continents, lasting from April 1997 to December 1997. During April 1998, the band reconvened for three festival dates in Spain and Portugal. These would end up being their last shows in over 10 years, as they announced their split later that month.

When Album of the Year was released in June 1997, Mike Bordin was called in to perform with Ozzy Osbourne for that year's edition of Ozzfest, which ran from May 24 to July 1. This resulted in Robin Guy (of the band Rachel Stamp) filling in on drums for Bordin during a UK Top of the Pops performance on May 30, as well as an absence of any Faith No More shows during the month of June. Shortly after he returned from Ozzfest, the band had to cancel four July dates in Europe, so Bordin could attend the birth of his first daughter in San Francisco.

The Album of the Year tour is notable for featuring Limp Bizkit, a nu metal/rap metal band greatly influenced by Faith No More, as an opener for several 1997 US dates. They were frequently booed by Faith No More's fans, including during a September 1997 concert at the Electric Factory in Philadelphia, where the crowd booed them off stage. In a 2013 interview, Roddy Bottum reflected on the shows with Limp Bizkit, recalling "I fought it at the time. I had to really push to get a couple bands that I liked to get on the bill in Portland and Seattle on that leg. I had no interest in the sound of Limp Bizkit. It was not how I wanted to be represented at all. Not to be snotty at all, but that guy Fred Durst had a really bad attitude. He was kind of a jerk." Bottum also remembered an incident where Durst "called the audience faggots at one show when they booed him." Durst apologized to him after this show, as he did not know that Bottum had come out as gay in the early 90s. Limp Bizkit's guitarist Wes Borland later claimed that his band were excited about the prospect of getting to tour with Faith No More, stating "the idea of it was cool [but] once we got there, it was a really tough crowd. They have a really tough crowd to please, who are very vocal about not liking you. We opened for Faith No More and Primus in the same year, and the Primus tour went a lot better than the Faith No More tour." Borland added that he did not get to know Mike Patton personally until several years later.

During the tour, they would cover various songs, both in full and as snippets, such as the Aqua song "Barbie Girl", "Highway Star" by Deep Purple, Will Smith's "Men in Black", Herb Alpert's "This Guy's in Love with You" and the R. Kelly songs "I Believe I Can Fly" and "Gotham City". An intro tape was used at the beginning of shows, which contained "Also sprach Zarathustra", followed by an Elvis-style fanfare clip announcing Faith No More as being from Caesars Palace, Las Vegas. The band's setlists for the tour mainly consisted of their 1990s material, with songs from Introduce Yourself and The Real Thing being played less frequently than before. However, the track "As the Worm Turns" (from 1985's We Care a Lot) began to appear more often this tour, having been mostly absent throughout the 1995 King for a Day... Fool for a Lifetime tour. All songs from Album of the Year were played during the tour, with the sole exception of "She Loves Me Not", which still remains one of the only studio album songs Faith No More has never performed live. The two b-sides "The Big Kahuna" and "Light Up & Let Go" were also not played, and have remained unperformed to this day. "Helpless" was only performed a single time on the tour, during the October 26, 1997 show at Festival Hall in Melbourne, Australia.

On the European legs, Faith No More performed in Croatia and Luxembourg, two countries they had never previously visited.

Concert dates

Early European shows 
{| class="wikitable" style="text-align:center;"
|-
! style="width:200px;"| Date
! style="width:200px;"| City
! style="width:150px;"| Country
! style="width:300px;"| Venue
!Other Performers
|-
| April 22, 1997(First show since September 1995, and first show with Jon Hudson) || London || England || Hippodrome ||
|-
| April 28, 1997 || Stockholm || Sweden || Electric Garden ||
|-
| April 30, 1997 || Amsterdam || Netherlands || Paradiso ||
|-
| May 3, 1997 || Paris || France || Élysée Montmartre || Treponem Pal
|-
| May 4, 1997 || Colgone || Germany || Bürgerhaus Stollwerck ||
|-
| May 5, 1997 || Berlin || Germany || SO 36 ||
|-
| May 6, 1997 || Hamburg || Germany || Markthalle || Bad Sin
|-
| May 8, 1997 || Paris || France || Nulle Part Ailleurs ||
|-
| May 12, 1997 || Glasgow || Scotland || Arches ||
|-
| May 13, 1997 || Nottingham || England || Rock City ||
|-
| May 13, 1997 || London || England || Astoria || A
|-
| May 16, 1997 || London || England || TFI Friday ||
|-
| May 30, 1997(With Robin Guy of Rachel Stamp on drums) || London || England || BBC Top of the Pops || Spice Girls
|-
| colspan="5"|Album of the Year is released around the world in June 1997|}

 July '97 Florida shows 

 First European leg 

 North American leg 

 Australia/New Zealand leg 

 Japanese leg 

 Second European leg 

 Late European shows 

Songs performed
Studio songsWe Care a Lot
"We Care a Lot"
"As the Worm Turns"

Introduce Yourself
"Introduce Yourself"
"Chinese Arithmetic"
"Death March"

The Real Thing
"From Out of Nowhere"
"Epic"
"Surprise! You're Dead!"

Angel Dust
"Land of Sunshine"
"Caffeine"
"Midlife Crisis"
"Be Aggressive"
"Midnight Cowboy" (John Barry)
"Easy" (Commodores)

King for a Day... Fool for a Lifetime
"Get Out"
"Ricochet" (performed only once live)
"Evidence"
"The Gentle Art of Making Enemies"
"Ugly in the Morning"
"Digging the Grave"
"Take This Bottle"
"King for a Day"
"What a Day"
"Just a Man"
"I Started a Joke" (Bee Gees)

Album of the Year
"Collision"
"Stripsearch"
"Last Cup of Sorrow"
"Naked in Front of the Computer"
"Helpless" (performed only once live)
"Mouth to Mouth"
"Ashes to Ashes"
"Got That Feeling"
"Paths of Glory"
"Home Sick Home"
"Pristina"

Cover songs
"Ain't Talkin' 'bout Dub" (Apollo 440)
"Barbie Girl" (Aqua)
"Gotham City" (R. Kelly)
"I Believe I Can Fly" (R. Kelly)
"I Want to Know What Love Is" (Foreigner)
"Need You Tonight" (INXS)
"Highway Star" (Deep Purple)
"This Guy's in Love With You" (Burt Bacharach / Herb Alpert)
"This Town Ain't Big Enough for Both of Us" (Sparks)

References

Faith No More concert tours
1997 concert tours